Sandy & Junior were a Brazilian pop music duo consisting of siblings Sandy Leah Lima (born January 28, 1983) and Durval de Lima Júnior (born April 11, 1984). They first gained notoriety by being the children of Xororó from popular sertanejo duo Chitãozinho & Xororó. Sandy & Junior began by singing children's songs and sertanejo-influenced tracks (their first single, "Maria Chiquinha", is a classic sertanejo song). Once they reached adolescence, they changed their style to pop-influenced songs, mainly ballads and upbeat songs. They became a pop phenomenon in Brazil with the release of the albums Era Uma Vez... Ao Vivo (1998), As Quatro Estações (1999), Quatro Estações: O Show (2000) and Sandy & Junior (2001), which sold more than 9 million copies together, receiving multiple diamond certificates. Época magazine compared their success to Beatlemania. One of the best-selling Brazilian artists of all time, Sandy & Junior sold over 20 million albums.

They had a self-titled weekly television series between 1999 and 2002 on Rede Globo and released the movie Acquária in 2003; Sandy also starred in the soap opera Estrela-Guia in 2001. Earlier, they had appeared in Renato Aragão movie O Noviço Rebelde, in 1997.

On April 17, 2007 Sandy & Junior announced that an MTV Unplugged album to be recorded in May 2007 would be their final work together, through a video posted on their website addressed to their fans and in a press conference, stating also that their career as a duo would be over at the end of 2007. Both have experienced solo work: Junior as a record producer and Sandy as a solo singer. 

In March 2019, they announced the Nossa História tour in celebration of the 30th anniversary of the duo's first televised performance, which took place in 1989. With several dates in stadiums, the tour had several extra dates to accommodate more fans.

Discography

Studio albums

Live albums

Compilation albums

Singles

Extra singles

Tours 
Tô Ligado em Você (1994)
Dig Dig Joy (1996—97)
Eu Acho Que Pirei Tour (1998—99)
Quatro Estações Tour (2000—01)
Sandy & Junior 2002 (2002—03)
Identidade Tour (2004—05)
Sandy & Junior 2006 (2006—07)
Acústico MTV (2007)
Nossa História (2019)

See also

 List of best-selling CDs (Brazil)
List of best-selling remix albums

References

External links
 SandyBR.com 
 Official Site 
 SandyLeah.com 

 
Brazilian musical duos
Sibling musical duos
Musical groups established in 1989
Musical groups disestablished in 2007
Musical groups reestablished in 2019
Musical groups disestablished in 2020
Brazilian pop music groups
Teen pop groups
1989 establishments in Brazil
2007 disestablishments in Brazil
Musical groups from Campinas
Universal Music Latino artists
PolyGram artists
Universal Music Group artists
Pop music duos
Male–female musical duos